Q96 was a radio station in Renfrewshire, Scotland.

Q96 may also refer to:
 Al-Alaq, a surah of the Quran